The  or "Sixteen Rakan Rocks" is a monument to the local fishermen in Yuza, Yamagata Prefecture, Japan. Carved from volcanic rock by a Buddhist monk between 1864 and 1868, there are in total twenty-two figures: the Sixteen Arhats along with Shakyamuni, Manjusri, Fugen and his consort, Avalokitesvara, and the Sarira. A little to the south of the carvings is Dewa Futami, or the Wedded rocks of Dewa Province.

The Jūroku Rakan Iwa are among the 100 Fishing Village Heritage Sites sponsored by the National Association of Fisheries and endorsed by the Ministry of Agriculture, Forestry and Fisheries.

There is an annual ceremony in late July, when the sculptures are illuminated at night.

See also

 Japanese sculpture
 Arhat
 Sixteen Arhats
 Fukura Station

References

External links
  100 Select Monuments of the History of Fishing

Tourist attractions in Yamagata Prefecture
Japanese sculpture
Fishing industry in Japan
Monuments and memorials in Japan
Buildings and structures in Yamagata Prefecture